The Seattle–Bremerton ferry is a ferry route across Puget Sound between Seattle and Bremerton, Washington.  Since 1951, the route has primarily been operated by the state-run Washington State Ferries system, currently the largest ferry system in the United States. Kitsap Transit also runs passenger-only "fast ferries" service on the route.

History

The Seattle–Bremerton ferry route was once known as the "Navy Yard route".  Before ferry service, the route was served by steamships and steamboats, such as the Inland Flyer.  The sternwheeler Bailey Gatzert, once considered one of the most prestigious vessels to operate on Puget Sound and the Columbia River, was converted to an automobile ferry and as such became the first ferry to run on the Seattle-Bremerton route.   Another vessel to run on the route was the unique "streamlined" ferry Kalakala.

From 1986 to 2002, Washington State Ferries operated passenger-only service on the Bremerton route using specialized high-speed boats. After the service was cancelled, Kitsap Transit contracted with private companies to operate a similar service for several years, and later debuted its own service, Kitsap Fast Ferries, on July 10, 2017.

Current status

The route from Seattle departs from the Washington State Ferry Terminal on the central Seattle waterfront.  Normally assigned to the route are the Super-class ferry  Kaleetan and Olympic-class ferry Chimacum, with the Jumbo Class ferry Walla Walla filling in when maintenance needs allow.

Popular culture
A ship (Klickitat) in this ferry route is mentioned in the Emergency! TV movie "Most Deadly Passage" that first aired in 1978.

See also
 Ferries in Washington (state)
 Washington State Ferries

Notes

References
 Demoro, Harre, The Evergreen Fleet – A Pictorial History of Washington State Ferries, Golden West Books, San Marino, CA (1971) 
 Kline, Mary S., and Bayless, G.A., Ferryboats – A Legend on Puget Sound, Bayless Books, Seattle, WA (1983) 
 Newell, Gordon, R., ed., H.W. McCurdy Marine History of the Pacific Northwest, Superior Publishing, Seattle, WA (1966)

Ferry routes in western Washington (state)
Transportation in King County, Washington
History of King County, Washington
Transportation in Kitsap County, Washington
History of Kitsap County, Washington